Alexander Moritz Frey (1881–1957) was a German author known for his fantasy books. He was also known for his satirical columns in the press.

World War I 
Frey, a pacifist, served as a medic in the same regiment as Adolf Hitler during World War I. According to Frey, in an essay called "The Unknown Private—Personal Memories of Hitler" that was not discovered until decades after his death, Hitler adopted his famous style of moustache after being ordered to have his original full one trimmed when it caused problems in getting his gas mask on.

Remembrance 
Frey was featured in an exhibition in Berlin in 2011 dedicated to writers whose books were burned at an event organised by the German Student Union on 10 May 1933 during which Joseph Goebbels gave a speech praising it as "a breakthrough in the German revolution."

References

Further reading

External links
 

1881 births
1957 deaths
German fantasy writers
German satirists
German pacifists
German male non-fiction writers